A fire-saw is a firelighting tool. It is typically an object "sawed" against a piece of wood, using friction to create an ember. It is divided into two components: a "saw" and a "hearth" (fireboard).

History
Two forms of the fire-saw have been documented in central and western Australia. One model is a split, notched stick as a hearth, and a knife-like hardwood stick as the saw. The other model makes use of the woomera weapon and defensive shield that natives carried.

In the Philippines and Oceania, a fire-saw from bamboo pieces is common.

Fire thong

A fire thong is a form of fire-saw, where a pullstring (usually wood fibre or rope) is used to saw. It is common in Southeast Asia and Oceania.

See also
Fire plough
Hand drill

References

Firelighting using friction
Primitive technology